It's D'Lovely 1947–1950 is a 2004 album consisting of a series of recordings by Tommy Dorsey from the late 1940s.  It displays Dorsey's focus on the swing jazz big band style, despite the growing popularity of bop at the time.

Track listing

Credits
Clarinets: Johnny Mince, Peanuts Hucko, Buddy DeFranco
Cornets: Bobby Hackett
Pianist: Teddy Wilson
Tenor Sax: Corky Corcoran
Trombone: Tommy Dorsey
Trumpets: Charlie Shavrs, Ziggy Elman
Vocals: Hannah Williams

References

2004 compilation albums
Tommy Dorsey albums